The Black Heritage Trail is a National Recreation Trail located in Columbus, Georgia.  It is an urban trail connecting 30 African American Heritage Points of interest. The Trail features many contributions and significant events in African American History of Columbus.

 Ma Rainey Home
 First African Baptist Church
 St. John AME Church
 Claflin School
 Metropolitan Baptist Church
 Restored Train Station
 Saint James AME Church
 Old City Jail
 Friendship Baptist Church
 The Liberty Theatre
 Spencer High School
 Porterdale Cemetery
 Old Slave Cemetery
 Fifth Avenue School
 Mildred L. Terry Library
 Fourth Street Baptist
 The Spencer House
 Columbus Urban League
 Brick Streets Laid by Slaves
 First Interracial Law Firm of Columbus
 Primus King Site
 Springer Opera House
 Dr. Thomas H. Brewer Assassination Site
 Site of first Silent store
 Temperance Hall
 Greater Shady Grove Baptist Church
 City Mills
 Isaac Maund House
 Kinfolks Corner
 Dillingham Street Bridge

The trail received National Recreation Trail Designation from the Secretary of the Interior during a 2000 ceremony at the historic Liberty Theater. The ceremony paid tribute to Ms. Judith Grant, a  Black Heritage Trail organizer and local historian.

References

External links
 The Black Heritage Trail - Columbus, Georgia - Official Site

National Recreation Trails in Georgia (U.S. state)
Geography of Columbus, Georgia
Hiking trails in Georgia (U.S. state)
Tourist attractions in Columbus, Georgia
African-American historic places
Urban heritage trails
African-American history of Georgia (U.S. state)